Dejan Šomoci (born 24 January 1983) is a Croatian retired football midfielder.

In June 2021, Šomoci was reportedly assumed to take the role of sports director at Slaven Belupo, but he became a board member and assistant to new sports director Zoran Zekić in March 2022.

References

External links
Dejan Šomoci profile at Nogometni Magazin 

1983 births
Living people
Sportspeople from Koprivnica
Association football midfielders
Croatian footballers
NK Slaven Belupo players
NK Koprivnica players
Croatian Football League players